Joseph Arthur Strong (10 June 1876 – 9 September 1927) was an  Australian rules footballer who played with South Melbourne in the Victorian Football League (VFL).

Notes

External links 

1876 births
1927 deaths
Australian rules footballers from Melbourne
Sydney Swans players
People from Brunswick, Victoria